Ysbyty Eryri (English: Snowdonia Hospital) is a health facility in Lôn Parc, Caernarfon, Gwynedd, Wales. It is managed by the Betsi Cadwaladr University Health Board.

History
The facility has its origins in the Caernarfon Union Workhouse which opened in 1846. An infirmary was established in the north-east part of the site in 1914. It became the Caernarfon Public Assistance Institution in 1930 and it joined the National Health Service as Eryri Hospital in 1948. Services were transferred from the Caernarfon Eye and Cottage Hospital when it closed in 1981. X-ray services were reduced by two-thirds in 2013.

References

Hospitals in Gwynedd
Hospitals established in 1846
1846 establishments in Wales
Hospital buildings completed in 1846
NHS hospitals in Wales
Betsi Cadwaladr University Health Board